The 1977 Abilene Christian Wildcats football team was an American football team that represented Abilene Christian University (ACU) as a member of the Lone Star Conference (LSC) during the 1977 NAIA Division I football season. In their first season under head coach DeWitt Jones, the Wildcats compiled an 11–1–1 record (5–1–1 against conference opponents) and tied for the LSC championship.

Wide receiver Cleotha Montgomery and tight end Kirby Jones received first-team honors on the 1977 All-Lone Star Conference football team. Quarterback John Mayes and four defensive players were chosen for the second team. Other key players included Kelly Kent who rushed for over 1,000 yards.

The team played its home games at Shotwell Stadium in Abilene, Texas.

Schedule

References

Abilene Christian
Abilene Christian Wildcats football seasons
Lone Star Conference football champion seasons
NAIA Football National Champions
Abilene Christian Wildcats football